In fluid dynamics, Sauter mean diameter (SMD, d32 or D[3, 2]) is an average of particle size. It was originally developed by German scientist Josef Sauter in the late 1920s. It is defined as the diameter of a sphere that has the same  volume/surface area ratio as a particle of interest.
Several methods have been devised to obtain a good estimate of the SMD.

SMD is typically defined in terms of the surface diameter, ds:

and volume diameter, dv:

where Ap and Vp are the surface area and volume of the particle, respectively.  If ds and dv are measured directly by other means without knowledge of Ap or Vp, Sauter  diameter (SD) for a given particle is

If the actual surface area, Ap and volume, Vp of the particle are known the equation simplifies further:

This is usually taken as the mean of several measurements, to obtain the Sauter mean diameter, SMD:

This provides intrinsic data that help determine the particle size for fluid problems.

Applications
The SMD can be defined as the diameter of a drop having the same volume/surface area ratio as the entire spray.

 is the scalar variable for the dispersed phase
 is the discrete bubble size

SMD is especially important in calculations where the active surface area is important.  Such areas include catalysis and applications in fuel combustion.

See also
Sphericity

References

Fluid dynamics